The Romanian Space Agency (ROSA) is a public institution with extra-budgetary funding that coordinates Romania's national space technology research programs and space research-related activities. ROSA was founded in 1991 and is subordinated to the Ministry of Education.

As a representative of the Romanian Government, the Romanian Space Agency establishes cooperative agreements with international organizations such as the European Space Agency and the Committee on Space Research (COSPAR) as well as bilateral agreements. Along with the Ministry of Foreign Affairs, ROSA represents Romania at the United Nations Committee on the Peaceful Use of Outer Space - COPUOS and at its subcommittees.

The Romanian Space Agency also conducts research projects through the ROSA Research Center.

History
Romania has a long-standing reputation in the aeronautical industry, which includes several historical personalities such as:
 Conrad Haas, Constructor of multistage rockets with delta stabilizers in 1529 (Sibiu).
 Traian Vuia, designer and constructor of the first autonomous take-off aeroplane in 1906.
 Henri Coandă, designer and constructor of the first jet aeroplane in 1910.
 Hermann Oberth, designer of space rockets and "father of space navigation".
 Elie Carafoli, contributor in aerodynamics and space sciences, former president of the IAF.

Romania is host to a heritage of companies like Aerostar, Avioane Craiova, Industria Aeronautică Română, Romaero and Societatea Pentru Exploatări Tehnice. Romania currently manufactures twenty types of aircraft, based on a mix of domestic and international designs.

The country has experience in the field of space applications, such as satellite communications, remote sensing, geographic information systems and global information, positioning and navigation systems. Since 1977 it has operated an Intelsat ground station in Cheia with two 32 m antennas. Romania contributed to more than thirty scientific and technological space missions in the Interkosmos program, including the 1981 flight of Dorin-Dumitru Prunariu on the Soyuz 40.
 
The Government, along with private entities in Romania, support these space activities and contribute them to being an important and necessary element for social development. In 1992, Romania was one of the first Eastern European countries to sign a cooperation agreement with ESA for the peaceful uses of outer space, followed by a Framework Agreement with ESA in 2006. Romania contributed through co-investigators to several ESA missions such as Hershel, Planck, SOHO and Gaia.

Since 2012, the Romanian flag has been raised at the European Space Agency (ESA) headquarters, after Romania officially became the 19th ESA Member State on December 22, 2011.

With Romania's accession to ESA, Romanian researchers and industry now have the opportunity to participate in ESA missions. Over two decades of research and consulting efforts have resulted in the Romanian Space Agency (ROSA) becoming a scientific and high technology organization that coordinates, promotes and represents the national research activities and space aerospace and security applications.

Objectives 
ROSA's main objective is to promote space research and development activities and to initiate and coordinate basic and applied research in space. ROSA ensures Romania's active presence in international actions that lead to advances in space and the use of outer space for peaceful purposes. ROSA represents the government in relations arising from agreements concluded by Romania with foreign partners regarding space problems.

Management 
Since 2004, Marius-Ioan Piso (born on January 7, 1954) has been acting President of the Romanian Space Agency (ROSA) and executive director of the same organization since 2005, Piso has a PhD in physics and a Senior Scientist 1st degree. Piso coordinates the Agency's development following three strategic directions: the Romanian space strategy implementation's planning and coordination, representing Romania nationally and internationally and the constant development of partnerships, collaborations and bi- and multi-lateral relationships. Piso is also responsible for overseeing the Agency's involvement in national and international research and development programmes in space, aeronautics and security domains.

His name is linked to the establishment of the Romanian Space Agency in 1991 and the organization's independence four years later, to the foundation of the Institute of Space Science, and also to Romania and European Space Agency (ESA) cooperation's start. The constant concern regarding space research and technology development in Romania and the results obtained over time by the scientific and technological community, often under his supervision or guidance, have resulted in the country's accession to the European Space Agency in January 2011.

ROSA components

Coordination

The STAR Programme 
The STAR Research, Development and Innovation Programme - Space Technology and Advanced Research for the 2012-2019 period, approved by Law no. 262/2011, is the instrument through which the Ministry of Education, Youth and Sports - the National Authority for Scientific Research (ANCS) ensures, through Romanian Space Agency (ROSA) as the lead organization of the program, the national support for the implementation of the Agreement between Romania and the European Space Agency (ESA) on Romania's accession to the ESA Convention.

The STAR programme has held two competitions so far.

Activities in the national and international programs

National programs 
 Leadership of national program of CD-I AEROSPACE
 Leadership of national program of CD-I SECURITY
 CEEX (11 projects coordinated and 7 as a partner)
 CORINT (3 projects coordinated)
 INFOSOC (2 projects coordinated and 1 as a partner)
 AMTRANS (1 project coordinated and 1 as a partner)
 AGRAL (1 project coordinated)
 RELANSIN (1 project coordinated)
 PNCDI-I (10 projects coordinated and 8 as a partner)
 PNCDI-II (10 projects coordinated and 10 as a partner)

International programs 
 The European Space Agency(ESA) (3)
 6th Framework Program of the European Commission CD-I (5)
 United Nations [2] (UN) Programs (2)
 Food and Agricultural organizational programs (2)
 PHARE Program (1)
 Bilateral and multilateral collaborations (10)
 Participation in consortia, networks, technology platforms

National and international affiliations 
 Space Agencies Forum (1997)
 COSPAR (Committee for Space Research International Council of Science) (1994) - Romanian secretariat
 European Space Agency (ESA) - representative of Romania (1993 -)
 EURISY - member (2000)
 United Nations Regional Network for Space Sciences and Technology (1997)

Major international agreements 
 ESA: ESA European Cooperating State - 2006 and PECS 2007-2011
 France: Agreement with CNES (2000) - ADAM  project; Agreement with CNES (2004) - COROT space mission
 Italy: Agreement of scientific cooperation signed with the National Research Council of Italy (CNR) in 2003
 NASA: Understanding signed in May 2000. Projects in telemedicine, agriculture, microgravity experiments on the International Space Station
 NASA: Alpha Magnetic Spectrometer Entertainment for the (AMS) on the ISS
 Azerbaijan: Co-operation agreement signed in 2003 with the Azerbaijan National Aerospace Agency
 Bulgaria: Agreement of co-operation in the exploration and peaceful uses of outer space in 1997 signed with the Bulgarian Aerospace Agency
 Eastern countries (Bulgaria, Czech Republic, Greece, Hungary, Poland, Slovak Republic, Turkey) Contribution to the Regional Network for Research and Education in Space Science and Technology (under the auspices of the United Nations)
 Hungary: Agreement of space cooperation signed in 1998 with the Hungarian Space Office
 Italy: Agreement of co-operation signed in 1998 with the Italian Space Agency

Romanian experiment on STS-133 
The final flight of NASA's space shuttle Discovery - NASA mission STS-133 - transported a Romanian experiment created by the Romanian Institute for Space Science to the International Space Station. Growth and Survival of Colored Fungi in Space (CFS-A) was an experiment designed to determine the effect of microgravity and cosmic radiation on the growth and survival of colored fungi species.

Principal investigators: Dumitru Hasegan, Romanian Institute for Space Science, Bucharest. (ESA). The launch of STS-133 took place on February 24, 2011. For more details visit the mission's official webpage.

GOLIAT 
Goliat is the first Romanian artificial microsatellite, launched on February 13, 2012. It was selected to be launched into orbit by the European Vega rocket, on its first operational flight.The entire system was developed and designed by ROSA in collaboration with the Institute of Space Science and BITNET and ELPROF companies, between 2005 and 2007. The microsatellite is a cube with sides of 10 inches and a weight of one kilogram.

The Goliat mission was funded by the National Authority for Scientific Exploration within the National Excellence Research program and it has an educational character, being the first microsatellite launched in a ROSA space in a programme.

RoBiSAT 
RoBiSAT represents the second Romanian artificial nanosatellites mission. The mission is composed of 2 Cubesat 2U-type satellites and was supposed to be part of the QB50 constellation. They were to be sent to the ISS in the second quarter of 2017 on the Cygnus CRS OA-7 however the mission was postponed indefinitely.

The two nanosatellites, called Robisat 1 and Robisat 2, were built at the Institute of Space Science located in Magurele, Romania.

Expertise 
ROSA is a public organization, integral contract-based financed; sources: RTD contracts, consultancy, international cooperation, management.

National expertise 
National Attributes:
 Acting under the Authority of the Romanian Government - Ministry of Education and Research (1995)
 Reporting to the Sub-commission for Space – RO Parliament (2007)
 Executive president for the Inter-Ministerial Board on Security Research (2004) and Inter-agency INSPIRE Group of experts
 Interagency coop.: Ministry of National Defense, Ministry of Foreign Affairs, Ministry of Agriculture and Rural Development, Ministry of Interior Affairs, Romanian Intelligence Service
 Contract authority and PMU for the national RTD Programs on Space, Aeronautics, Security (1995-2008)
 Component of the National Emergencies Council  (2000)
 National Certification Authority for GRID information infrastructures (2006)
 Certified security and classification organizational structure authorized to establish research and development Centers oriented on specific objectives of the Romanian RTD Plan

International expertise

International attributes 
ROSA is the appointed national representative for:
 European Space Agency (ESA) – by Laws 40/1993 and 01/2007 (1992 – p)
 United Nations – Committee on the Peaceful uses of Outer Space (COPUOS) – by mandate from the Foreign Ministry (1994 – p)
 Consultant for the EU Space Council / European Space Policy
 EC – FP6 – AEROSPACE PC (2001-2006)
 EC – FP7 – SPACE PC, SECURITY RESEARCH PC, TRANSPORTS PC (Aeronautics and Galileo)
 EC – GNSS Supervisory Authority (GSA), GMES Advisory Council (GAC) (2007)
 INSPIRE – by mandate from the Ministry of Education and Research (2005 – p)
 COSPAR – ICSU – National secretariat (1994 - )
 GEO – Principal representative
 NATO – Scientific Committee “Science for Peace and Security” (2004 – p)
 NATO - RTO – Space ST Advisory Group (SSTAG) (2005 – p)
 Space agencies: NASA, CNES (French Space Agency), Russia ROSKOSMOS (negotiations), Hungary, Bulgaria, Azerbaijan . . .
 Bilateral agreements International organizations membership and/or national representative: COSPAR, IAF, IAA, EURISY, ACARE, EREA, ASD, EDA, others
 Bilateral agreements with research organizations

Joining ESA 
The first agreement between Romania and the European Space Agency (ESA) was signed in 1992, followed in 1999 by the Romania-ESA Agreement on cooperation in the peaceful exploration and use of space. Since 2007, Romania contributes to the ESA budget as a European Cooperating State (PECS), status ratified by Law no. 1/2007.

On December 22, 2011, Romania became the 19th member of the European Space Agency.

An important step in the accession process was to conduct a technical audit on the relevant entities in Romania (institutes, research centres, industrial companies and SMEs), which have space technological capabilities. The audit was conducted by ESA, based on a sample of 130 entities, 50 of them being organized technical visits and interviews.

The full member state of the European Space Agency status gives the organizations in Romania access, in the same way as the ESA countries, to all programs run. This is an important technology transfer and the opening of a high-tech market. The intellectual property is maintained at a national level, having an important role in the establishment of competence in the country.

Research

ROSA Research Center 
The ROSA Research Center (RRC) was organized in 1998 as an entity legally represented by ROSA. RRC joined all research capacities in unique management. Another step was the joint venture agreements concluded with CRUTA – the Romanian Center for Remote Sensing Applications in Agriculture – an SME laboratory initially organized as an independent branch of the ISPIF (Research and Development Institute for Land Use). A joint venture agreement was concluded with the Institute of Space Science in Bucharest. Since 2001, the RRC has been selected by the Ministry of Education and Research as a Center of Excellence in Space Applications.

Since 2006, on behalf of the Romanian Government, ROSA has strengthened its relationship with ESA by signing a PECS agreement.

The fields of science and technology knowledge developed by RRC are space dynamics, in particular, small satellites and tethered systems, magnetic fluids and magneto-fluidic composites; earth observation (remote sensing) satellite data retrieval, processing, algorithms and software development, applications development; spatial information systems integration, Global Navigation Satellite Systems and space technology for risk management and security.
 
RRC developed, since 2003, R&D projects addressing national strategy, as well as technological development in the GNSS field. One of the last projects, “Capacity, Infrastructure and Applications for GNSS-GALILEO” directly addressed the problem of extending EGNOS in Eastern Europe through infrastructure development.

Results of the research activities 
Romanian Space Agency has no object of industrialization and marketing. The research results were used for the development of systems and services dedicated to a particular beneficiary (information systems, consulting, education):
 Consulting services in satellite and inertial navigation applications (aerospace and GIS)
 Quality control services for the implementation of LPIS (system control plot) for agricultural subventions (paying agency of the Ministry of Agriculture)
 Information systems consulting for units/research (SMEs)
 Educational Software for remote sensing satellite and specialized disaster monitoring (European Space Agency)
 Pilot control system for Prahova SIPA plot
 Geographic information services through satellite remote sensing (Ministry of Waters, Forests and Environment)
 Satellite communication systems and data communication services (SMEs)
 Consulting regarding industries (European Space Agency)
 Pilot control system for Prahova SIPA plot
 Geographic information services through satellite remote sensing (Ministry of Waters, Forests and Environment)
 Satellite communication systems and data communication services (SMEs)
 Consulting services industries (European Space Agency)
 Experimental model of nanosatellite GOLIAT (prototype)
 Training services, research and military and civil geospatial missions (Military Technical Academy)
 Spatial data infrastructure for environmental applications (WEATHER)
 National Infrastructure in satellite navigation (SMEs)
 Demonstration model for the formation of UAVs
 Demonstration model for the formation of nanosatellites
 Professional software with educational components for numerical simulation of flows in aerodynamics (Universities, SMEs)
 Activities developed on national and international programs

ESERO Romania 
Launched during the ‘Romanian Space Week’, an annual scientific conference organized by ROSA between May 12–16, 2014, ESERO Romania was established as the result of a partnership agreement between the Romanian Space Agency and the European Space Agency (ESA), and it joins a European network of ESEROs which are now present in 10 European countries.

ESERO is a project established by ESA aimed at using the fascination with space to support the teaching and learning of STEM subjects (Science, Technology, Engineering and Mathematics) in European primary and secondary schools. Through ESERO Romania, ROSA and ESA plan to respond to Romanian specific national educational needs and eventually encourage the young generations to take up a STEM-related career.

Events

2014 
Annual Scientific Conference "Romanian Space Week", May 2014

Between May 12–16, 2014, the Romanian Space Agency (ROSA) organized the 2014 edition of the annual scientific conference "Romanian Space Week" (RSW 2014). The event was dedicated to presenting the implementation status of the projects funded through the Programme for Research, Development and Innovation for Space Technology and Advanced Research — STAR, which aims to improve Romania's industrial competitiveness in the Programmes of the European Space Agency.

The 2014 ESA-EUSC-JRC Image Information Mining Conference: The Sentinels Era, Bucharest, March 2014 

The Romanian Space Agency (ROSA) and the Politehnica University Bucharest (UPB) hosted the Ninth ESA-EUSC-JRC Image Information Mining Conference: The Sentinels Era, between March 5–7, 2014. The event was aimed at European space agencies and organizations, aerospace industry and research centres, value-added companies and service providers.

2013 
The 29th EUGridPMA Meeting, September 2013

Between September 9–11, 2013, the Romanian Space Agency (ROSA) organized the 29th meeting of the European Grid Policy Management Authority (EUGridPMA). The European Grid Policy Management Authority is an international organization that coordinates European e-Science authentication using digital certificates, and which, together with the Asia-Pacific Grid Policy Management Authority and the Americas Grid Policy Management Authority, form the International Grid Trust Federation.

2nd IAA Conference on Space Systems as Critical Infrastructure, August 2013 Between August 29–30, 2013 the Romanian Space Agency (ROSA) together with the International Academy of Astronautics (IAA) organized the 2nd Conference on Space Systems as Critical Infrastructure at the Golden Tulip Hotel in Mamaia, Black Sea, Romania. The symposium aims to explore how much we depend on satellites to support our most critical infrastructure and to live modern and mobile lives.The annual scientific conference of the "Space Technology and Advanced Research - STAR" Programme, June 2013

Between June 26–27, 2013, the Romanian Space Agency (ROSA), the coordinating organization of the Research, Development and Innovation Program - "Space Technology and Advanced Research" STAR, held the annual scientific conference dedicated to presenting the implementation stage of projects funded within the projects competition C1-2012.

ESA, ASTRIUM and Thales Alenia Space present the opportunities for participating in the ARTES 14 Programme (Advanced Research in Telecommunications Systems) at Bucharest, April 2013

The Romanian Space Agency (ROSA) organized an informative session on the ESA Programme dedicated to the next generation of Neosat platforms - ARTES 14 (Advanced Research in Telecommunications Systems). Representatives from ESA, as well as from prime contractors Astrium, a subsidiary of EADS (European Aeronautic Defence and Space Company) and Thales Alenia Space attended the event.
 
The briefing aimed to assess the possibilities, capabilities and interest in being involved in ARTES 14 from organizations in Romania, as well as to provide a better understanding of the general and specific issues related to this program.

The "European Earth Monitoring Programme GMES - Copernicus: Its benefits for the citizens of Eastern Europe" Conference, May 2013

The Romanian Space Agency, the European Space Agency, the European Commission and Eurisy jointly organized the second edition of the GMES COPERNICUS conference dedicated to Eastern Europe EU Member States. The conference took place in Bucharest, May 21–22, 2013.

Since the first edition in 2012, the main objective of the conference was to highlight the various opportunities Copernicus can and will offer, with a focus on the new EU member states from Eastern Europe.

2012 
PLEIADES: A new dimension of satellite imaging, October 2012

Organised by the Romanian Space Agency (ROSA) together with Astrium Geo-Services, the Faculty of Land Reclamation and Environment Engineering in Bucharest, the Military Technical University in Bucharest and Tradsym Consult, the event presented the features of the new Pleiades-SPOT constellation, as well as applications developed by Romanian researchers, based on the image database provided by SpotImage-Astrium Geo-Services.

Exploratory workshop with the scientific Romanian Diaspora on "Space — Science, Technology and Applications", September 2012

The workshop brought together Romanian scientists working abroad to discuss space applications resulting from science and technology. The event was part of the event "Diaspora in the Romanian Scientific Research and Higher Education".

1st IAA Conference on Space Systems as Critical Infrastructures, September 2012 
 
The conference was organized by the International Academy of Astronautics (IAA) and the Romanian Space Agency (ROSA), co-sponsored by the International Institute of Space Law (IISL), September 6–7, 2012.

GEOSS Summer School - Remote Sensing of the Black Sea Marine Environment, August 2012 

Romanian Space Agency (ROSA) organized the 4th edition of the GEOSS Summer School, part of the activities supporting GEO capacity building in Earth Observation. The goal of the summer school was to acquire knowledge on the current use of remote sensing, EO data and future remote sensing sensors, contributing to monitoring the marine environment evolution and satellite oceanography.

GMES: New Opportunities for Eastern Europe, May 2012

The Romanian Space Agency (ROSA), together with the European Space Agency (ESA) and the European Commission (EC) organized the "GMES: New Opportunities for Eastern Europe" conference May 3–4, 2012.

Space Situational Awareness Workshop, April 2012

ROSA together with the Research Agency on Military Technologies organized a workshop on Space Situational Awareness, where programmes of ESA and NATO were discussed, as well as the possibility to develop a Romanian ground-based facility for NEO and space debris observation, space weather contributions in Romania, high performance computing mobile for disaster management applications etc.

2011 
GEOSS Summer School: Advancing Earth Observation Data Understanding Crisis Management and Emergency Response, August 2011

Romanian Space Agency (ROSA) organized the 3rd edition of the GEOSS Summer School, part of the activities supporting GEO capacity building in Earth Observation. The main goal of this year's summer school is to acquire knowledge on the current use of EO data and image information mining techniques contributing to preventing, monitoring and assessing the impact of natural and man-made disasters and crisis situations.

2011 IAA Planetary Defense Conference: From Threat to Action, May 2011

The International Academy of Astronautics held its second conference on protecting our planet from impacts by asteroids and comets from May 9–12, 2011 in Bucharest, Romania. The 1st IAA Planetary Defense Conference: Protecting Earth from Asteroids, co-sponsored by the European Space Agency and The Aerospace Corporation, was the follow-on to three previous planetary defence conferences held in 2004 in Los Angeles and 2007 in Washington, D.C., and in 2009 in Granada, Spain.

See also
 List of government space agencies

Notes

References

External links
Homepage of ROSA
ROSA Facebook page
Homepage of NASA
Homepage of ESA
Astronomical Institute of Romanian Academy
ANCS
Planetary Defence Conference 9-12 May 2011 Bucharest
Romania accedes to ESA Convention 

Space agencies
1991 establishments in Romania
Science and technology in Romania
Organizations established in 1991
Space program of Romania